uFMOD (or μFMOD) is a freeware audio player library written in x86 assembly language.
It is used to load and play audio files in XM format.

In the library name, the lowercase u letter is the micro symbol μ 

The uFMOD source code can be compiled using FASM.

The uFMOD library was ported to several programming languages and development environments:

The AOCRYPT cryptographic engine uses uFMOD to ensure a specific executable file size. The patcher dUP2 uses uFMOD to play background music.

Games using uFMOD 
Due to its small size, the uFMOD is used in compact video games to play background music, for example:

 Lunar Jetman Remake, a PC remake of the ZX Spectrum original.
 Four-in-a-row, an open source game for Windows and Linux.
 Shooter 2D, an open source shooter implemented for the Independent Games Developers Contests (IGDC).
 Diamond Fighters, a freeware 2D arcade for Linux.

References

External links
 Project home page
 Flat Assembler topic

Audio libraries
Video game music technology